An octatomic element is a chemical element that, when standard conditions for temperature and pressure is stable, is in a configuration of eight atoms grouped together. The canonical example is sulfur, S8, but red selenium is also an octatomic element stable at room temperature. Octaoxygen is also known, but it is extremely unstable.

See also 
 Diatomic element

References 

Molecules